The 2011 NHK Trophy was the fourth event of six in the 2011–12 ISU Grand Prix of Figure Skating, a senior-level international invitational competition series. It was held at the Makomanai Sekisui Heim Ice Arena in Sapporo from November 10–13. Medals were awarded in the disciplines of men's singles, ladies' singles, pair skating, and ice dancing. Skaters earned points toward qualifying for the 2011–12 Grand Prix Final.

Eligibility
Skaters who reached the age of 14 by July 1, 2011 were eligible to compete on the senior Grand Prix circuit.

In July 2011, minimum score requirements were added to the Grand Prix series and were set at two-thirds of the top scores at the 2011 World Championships. Prior to competing in a Grand Prix event, skaters were required to earn the following:

Entries
The entries were as follows.

Schedule
(Local time, GMT +09:00):

 Thursday, November 10
 07:00–17:30 – Official practices
 Friday, November 11
 09:00–14:10 – Official practices
 14:55–16:00 – Short dance
 16:45–17:53 – Pairs' short
 19:15–20:33 – Ladies' short
 Saturday, November 12
 06:30–11:10 – Official practices
 12:00–13:14 – Free dance
 14:05–15:26 – Pairs' free
 15:30–16:00 – Medal ceremonies
 16:30–17:51 – Men's short
 19:00–20:33 – Ladies' free
 20:45–21:05 – Medal ceremony
 Sunday, November 13
 08:00–12:00 – Official practices
 12:55–14:35 – Men's free
 14:45–15:00 – Medal ceremony
 15:50–18:00 – Gala/Exhibitions

Results

Men
On November 12, Brandon Mroz of the United States became the first skater to land the quad lutz in an international competition when he landed it in the short program at NHK. Japan's Daisuke Takahashi won the short program by 10.66 points over Takahiko Kozuka. Takahashi fell on an under-rotated quad flip in the free skating. He stated, "For the first time in my life, I could nail a quad flip in the six-minute warm-up. But in the real competition I overstrained myself in landing and crashed. It still feels great now that I know how I could do it." Mroz attempted a quad lutz in the free but under-rotated and fell. A screw in Menshov's boot became damaged just before he skated his free skating.

Ladies
Japan's Akiko Suzuki won the short program while Mao Asada was first in the free skating. Suzuki took the gold medal, Asada the silver, and Alena Leonova the bronze.

Pairs
Having first attempted a rare throw triple axel at 2011 Skate America, Germany's Aliona Savchenko and Robin Szolkowy again attempted the element at NHK but again took a hard fall. They recovered to win the short program. Russia's Yuko Kavaguti and Alexander Smirnov pulled up from fifth in the short to take the gold medal, while Takahashi and Tran won silver and Savchenko and Szolkowy the bronze.

Ice dancing
Russia's Elena Ilinykh and Nikita Katsalapov placed first in the short dance, followed by Canada's Kaitlyn Weaver and Andrew Poje in second and Maia and Alex Shibutani of the United States in third. There were several accidents before the free dance. Canada's Alexandra Paul and Mitchell Islam withdrew after Paul suffered a cut to the back of the thigh in a collision with Italy's Lorenza Alessandrini and Simone Vaturi during the morning practice on November 12. There was also a collision in the warm-up just before the free dance involving Lynn Kriengkrairut and Logan Giulietti-Schmitt of the United States and Cathy Reed and Chris Reed of Japan; Chris Reed injured his right leg but both teams were able to compete in the free dance. Elena Ilinykh injured her knee when she crashed into the boards in the warm-up before the free dance; she and her partner finished the competition, winning the bronze, but withdrew from the exhibitions. The Shibutanis took the gold, edging out by 0.09 points Weaver and Poje, who had a one point deduction due to a lift held too long.

References

External links
 
 

Nhk Trophy, 2011
NHK Trophy